McKean County is a rural county in the Commonwealth of Pennsylvania. As of the 2020 census, the population was 40,432. Its county seat is Smethport. The county was created in 1804 and organized in 1826. It was named in honor of former Pennsylvania Governor and Declaration of Independence signer Thomas McKean.

McKean County comprises the Bradford, Pennsylvania micropolitan statistical area. It is in a sparsely populated region known as the Pennsylvania Wilds. It includes the Allegheny National Forest and borders New York. McKean County boasts of being "The Black Cherry Capital of the World."

McKean County was founded because of its natural resources of oil and timber, both of which continue to provide a significant input to the economy. Today, a university, rural medical center, federal prison and manufacturing companies balance the area's economy.

Geography
It has a warm-summer humid continental climate (Dfb) and average monthly temperatures in downtown Bradford range from 23.0 °F in January to 67.6 °F in July, while in Mount Jewett they range from 21.2 °F in January to 65.1 °F in July.

Adjacent counties
 Cattaraugus County, New York (north)
 Allegany County, New York (northeast)
 Potter County (east)
 Cameron County (southeast)
 Elk County (south)
 Forest County (southwest)
 Warren County (west)

Major highways

National protected area
 Allegheny National Forest (part)
 Allegheny National Recreation Area (part)

Demographics

As of the 2000 census, there were 45,936 people, 18,024 households, and 12,094 families residing in the county.  The population density was 47 people per square mile (18/km2).  There were 21,644 housing units at an average density of 22 per square mile (9/km2).  The racial makeup of the county was 96.46% White, 1.87% Black, 0.32% Native American, 0.30% Asian, 0.02% Pacific Islander, 0.40% from other races, and 0.61% from two or more races.  1.06% of the population were Hispanic or Latino of any race. 35.0% German, 22.2% Irish, 14.6% Italian, 12.3% English, 10.0% Swedish, 8.6% American, 5.8% Polish, and 3.7% French ancestry.

There were 18,024 households, out of which 30.50% had children under the age of 18 living with them, 52.50% were married couples living together, 10.10% had a female householder with no husband present, and 32.90% were non-families. 28.30% of all households were made up of individuals, and 13.30% had someone living alone who was 65 years of age or older.  The average household size was 2.40 and the average family size was 2.93.

In the county, the age distribution of the population shows 23.70% under the age of 18, 7.90% from 18 to 24, 28.50% from 25 to 44, 23.20% from 45 to 64, and 16.70% who were 65 years of age or older.  The median age was 39 years. For every 100 females there were 100.40 males.  For every 100 females age 18 and over, there were 98.70 males.

2020 Census

Micropolitan Statistical Area

The United States Office of Management and Budget has designated McKean County as the Bradford, PA micropolitan statistical area (USA).  As of the 2010 U.S. Census the micropolitan area ranked 13th most populous in Pennsylvania and the 277th most populous in the United States with a population of 43,450.

Law and government

|}

Voter Registration
As of February 21, 2022, there are 24,893 registered voters in McKean County.

 Democratic: 6,037 (24.25%)
 Republican: 15,357 (61.69%)
 Independent: 2,296 (9.22%)
 Third Party: 1,203 (4.83%)

State Senate
 Cris Dush, Republican, Pennsylvania's 25th Senatorial District

State House of Representatives
 Martin T. Causer, Republican, Pennsylvania's 67th Representative District

United States House of Representatives
 Glenn Thompson, Republican, Pennsylvania's 15th congressional district

United States Senate
 John Fetterman, Democrat
 Bob Casey, Jr., Democrat

Education

Public school districts
 Bradford Area School District
 Kane Area School District (also covers part of Elk County)
 Oswayo Valley School District (majority of which is in Potter County, covers small portion in McKean County)
 Otto-Eldred School District
 Port Allegany School District (also covers part of Potter County)
 Smethport Area School District

Private schools
As reported by EdNA, Pennsylvania Department of Education, June 2010.
 Bradford Area Christian Academy, Bradford
 Chestnut Street Christian School, Bradford
 Custer City Private School
 St. Bernard School, Bradford
 Learning Center Inc, Bradford
 United Christian Academy, Smethport

Libraries
 Bradford Area Public Library
 Friends Memorial Public Library - Kane
 Hamlin Memorial Library - Smethport
 Mount Jewett Memorial Library
 Samuel W Smith Memorial Public Library - Port Allegany

Other education entities
 Beacon Light Behavioral Health Systems - Custer City
 McKean County Historical Society's Museum at the Old Jail - Smethport
 Seneca Highlands Career and Technical Center - Port Allegany
 Seneca Highlands IU 9 - Smethport
 University of Pittsburgh at Bradford

Recreation
There is one Pennsylvania state park in McKean County. Kinzua Bridge State Park is between U.S. Route 6 and Pennsylvania Route 59, just east of the Allegheny National Forest near Mount Jewett. When it was built, it was the highest and longest railroad bridge in the world. It was chosen by the Pennsylvania Department of Conservation and Natural Resources (DCNR) and its Bureau of Parks as one of "Twenty Must-See Pennsylvania State Parks" and is a Historic Civil Engineering Landmark. A tornado destroyed much of the bridge in 2003.

Communities

Under Pennsylvania law, there are four types of incorporated municipalities: cities, boroughs, townships, and, in at most two cases, towns. The following cities, boroughs and townships are located in McKean County:

City
 Bradford

Boroughs
 Eldred
 Kane
 Lewis Run
 Mount Jewett
 Port Allegany
 Smethport (county seat)

Townships

 Annin
 Bradford
 Ceres
 Corydon
 Eldred
 Foster
 Hamilton
 Hamlin
 Keating
 Lafayette
 Liberty
 Norwich
 Otto
 Sergeant
 Wetmore

Census-designated places
 Foster Brook
 Rew

Unincorporated communities
 Burning Well
 Coryville
 Cyclone
 Derrick City
 Farmers Valley
 Gifford
 Ludlow

Population ranking
The population ranking of the following table is based on the 2010 census of McKean County.

† county seat

See also
 National Register of Historic Places listings in McKean County, Pennsylvania

References

External links

 A resource website for families in McKean County including the McKean County Resource Directory
 McKean County Government
 McKean County Capitol History
 Bradford Today
 Bradford Era News
 Gardeau Train Wreck of 2006 - A website about the train wreck and chemical spill of June 30, 2006. Location: Gardeau, Norwich Township, McKean County, Pennsylvania

 
1826 establishments in Pennsylvania
Counties of Appalachia
Populated places established in 1826